Zetan may refer to:

An alien race that supposedly inhabits the star system Zeta Reticuli
A fictional character in the film Circle of Iron, played by Christopher Lee
Zeitan, a village in central Israel

See also
 The Greek letter zeta
 Zetang
 Aliens in Fallout 4

Extraterrestrial life in popular culture